lies east of Hadano in Kanagawa Prefecture, Japan.
It reaches a height of 235m above sea level, and together with the adjacent Mount Gongen and Mount Asama forms an area called Mount Kobo Park. Locally the three are often collectively referred to as Mount Kōbō.

Etymology
According to folklore, Kōbō-Daishi trained at Mount Kōbō, giving rise to its name.

Transport
 On foot it is approximately 30 minutes from Hadano and Tōkaidaigakumae stations.
 An infrequent bus service runs from Hadano station to Soyakōbō (曽屋弘法).

External links

Kobo